William H. Allen may refer to:
William H. Allen (politician) (born 1851), member of the Mississippi House of Representatives
W. H. Allen (artist) (1863–1943), British watercolor artist
William Henry Allen (1784–1813), American naval officer
William Howard Allen (1790–1822), American naval officer

See also 
William Allen (disambiguation)